Sebrus is a genus of moths of the family Crambidae.

Species
Sebrus absconditus Bassi, 1995
Sebrus amandus Bleszynski, 1970
Sebrus argus Bassi, 1995
Sebrus perdentellus (Hampson, 1919)
Sebrus pseudosparsellus (Bleszynski, 1961)

References

Natural History Museum Lepidoptera genus database

Crambinae
Crambidae genera
Taxa named by Stanisław Błeszyński